Vayal is a 1981 Indian Malayalam film, directed by Antony Eastman and produced by M. D. Mathew. The film stars Kaviyoor Ponnamma, Sankaradi, Shubha and Cochin Haneefa in the lead roles. The film has musical score by G. Devarajan.

Cast
Kaviyoor Ponnamma as Saraswathi
Sankaradi as Kaimal
Shubha as Karthu
Cochin Haneefa as Paappi
Jalaja as Nandinikutty
Kuthiravattam Pappu as Sankunni
M. G. Soman as Govindankutty
Mala Aravindan as Naanu Nair
Silk Smitha as Parvathi
T. G. Ravi as Vaasu
Sukumari as Savithri
Santo Krishnan as Gunda
Benny as Unni
Joseph E. A.  as Venu
Sunitha (New) as Ponnamma

Soundtrack
The music was composed by G. Devarajan and the lyrics were written by R. K. Damodaran.

References

External links
 

1981 films
1980s Malayalam-language films